Smolders is a surname. Notable people with the surname include:

Hannes Smolders (born 1998), Belgian footballer 
Harrie Smolders (born 1980), Dutch equestrian
Tim Smolders (born 1980), Belgian footballer

See also
10983 Smolders, a main-belt asteroid
Smulders